War Memorial Stadium may refer to:

 Ada War Memorial Stadium, in Ada, Ohio, also known as War Memorial Stadium
 War Memorial Stadium (Arkansas), Little Rock, Arkansas
 War Memorial Stadium (Austin, Texas) (former official name 1924–1947), now Darrell K Royal–Texas Memorial Stadium
 War Memorial Stadium (Buffalo, New York), former stadium, now demolished
 War Memorial Stadium (Hampton, Virginia), in Hampton, Virginia
 War Memorial Stadium (Laramie, Wyoming), in Laramie, Wyoming
 War Memorial Stadium (Wailuku, Hawaii), home of the Hula Bowl
 World War Memorial Stadium, Greensboro, North Carolina, also known as War Memorial Stadium

See also
 Memorial Stadium (disambiguation)
 Veterans Memorial Stadium (disambiguation)
 War Memorial Auditorium (disambiguation)